Child's Play 3 is a 1991 American slasher film and the third installment in the Child's Play film series. The film is written by Don Mancini and directed by Jack Bender. Brad Dourif once again reprised his role as Chucky from the previous films while new cast members include Justin Whalin, Perrey Reeves and Jeremy Sylvers. Although released only nine months after Child's Play 2, the story takes place eight years following the events of that film, and one month before the events of Bride of Chucky (which was made seven years later). It was executive-produced by David Kirschner, who produced the first two Child's Play films.

Released on August 30, 1991, in the United States by Universal Pictures, Child's Play 3 received mixed-to-negative reviews from critics and disappointed at the box office, grossing only $20.5 million worldwide against a budget of $13 million.

The film became notorious in the United Kingdom when it was suggested it might have inspired the real-life murders of British children James Bulger and Suzanne Capper, suggestions rejected by officers investigating both cases.

Plot
Eight years after Chucky's second demise, the Play Pals company resumes manufacturing Good Guy dolls and re-opens the abandoned factory.  A splash of blood from Chucky's corpse is inadvertently mixed in with the plastic being used to produce the dolls, reviving him in a new body. Chucky is given to Play Pals CEO Mr. Sullivan, whom he tortures using various toys before strangling him to death, and then uses computer records to locate Andy Barclay.

Now 16, Andy has been sent to Kent Military School after failing to cope in several foster homes. Colonel Cochrane, the school's commandant, advises Andy to forget his "fantasies" about the doll. Andy befriends cadets Harold Aubrey Whitehurst; Ronald Tyler, an 8-year-old cadet; and Kristin da Silva, for whom he develops romantic feelings. He also meets Brett C. Shelton, a sadistic lieutenant colonel who routinely bullies the cadets.

Tyler is asked to deliver a package to Andy's room. Tyler realizes that the package contains a Good Guy doll and takes it to the cellar to open it. Chucky bursts from the package and is incensed to find Tyler instead of Andy, but remembering he can possess the first person who learns his true identity, he tells Tyler his secret. Before Chucky can enact the ritual, Cochrane interrupts them and confiscates the doll, throwing it into a garbage truck. Chucky escapes by luring the driver into the truck's compactor and crushing him.

That night, Chucky attacks Andy and tells him his plans for taking over Tyler's body. Before Andy can fight back, Shelton comes in and takes the doll from him. Andy then sneaks into Shelton's room to recover it; Shelton awakens to confront him, only to find that Chucky has vanished. Suspecting the doll was stolen, Shelton forces all the cadets to do exercises as punishment. Chucky attempts to possess Tyler again, but they are interrupted by da Silva and fellow cadet Ivers. Later, a knife-wielding Chucky surprises Cochrane, unintentionally shocking him into a fatal heart attack. The next morning, Andy tries to convince Tyler that Chucky is evil, but Tyler refuses to believe him. Meanwhile, Chucky kills the camp barber Sergeant Botnick by slashing his throat with a straight razor when Botnick attempts to cut his hair. Whitehurst witnesses this and flees.

Despite Cochrane's death, the school's annual war games are ordered to proceed as planned, with cadets divided between a "Red Team" and "Blue Team". Andy and Shelton are both on the Blue Team. Chucky secretly replaces the paint bullets of the Red team with live ammunition. When the simulation begins, Chucky lures Tyler away from his team. Finally realizing that Chucky is evil, Tyler stabs him with a pocket knife and flees to find Andy. Chucky then attacks da Silva and holds her hostage, forcing Andy to exchange Tyler for da Silva. The Blue team and Red team arrive on the scene and open fire; Shelton is killed by a bullet from the Red team, while Tyler escapes in the chaos. Chucky tosses a grenade at the quarrelling cadets. Whitehurst leaps on top of the grenade, sacrificing himself to save the others.

Chucky kills a security guard and kidnaps Tyler. Andy and da Silva pursue Chucky and Tyler into a haunted house themed roller-coaster at a nearby carnival called "The Devil's Lair". Chucky shoots da Silva in the leg; she tells Andy to go and face him alone. Andy shoots Chucky several times, destroying his left arm and preventing him from finishing the voodoo chant to possess Tyler. When Chucky attacks Andy, Tyler gives Andy his pocket knife, which he uses to cut off Chucky's right hand. Andy then throws Chucky down into a massive metal fan that is part of the attraction, shredding him to pieces and finally killing him. Afterwards, Andy is taken away by the police for questioning while da Silva is rushed to the hospital. Tyler's fate remains unknown as the carnival closes down.

Cast

 Justin Whalin as Andy Barclay
 Perrey Reeves as Kristin da Silva
Jeremy Sylvers as Ronald Tyler
Travis Fine as Cadet Lieutenant Colonel Brett C. Shelton
Dean Jacobson as Harold Aubrey Whitehurst
Brad Dourif as the voice of Chucky
Peter Haskell as Sullivan
Dakin Matthews as Colonel Francis Cochrane
Andrew Robinson as Sergeant Botnick
 Burke Byrnes as Sergeant Clark
 Matthew Walker as Ellis
 Donna Eskra as Jackie Ivers
Edan Gross as voice of Good Guy doll
Terry Wills as Garbage Man
Richard Marion as Patterson
Laura Owens as Lady Executive
Ron Fassler as Petzold
Michael Chieffo as Security Guard
Henry G. Sanders as Major

Development
Universal Studios had Don Mancini begin writing the third installment for the series before Child's Play 2 was released, causing pressure to him to draft a storyline on such a tight schedule. The film was formally greenlit after the successful release of its predecessor with a release date nine months away.

Mancini initially wanted to introduce the concept of "multiple Chuckys" in the movie, but due to budget constraints the idea was eventually scrapped. Mancini later used this concept for the 2017 sequel Cult of Chucky. It also was intended to open with a scene of a security guard portrayed by John Ritter frightening off a group of trespassing children at the Good Guys factory by telling them scary stories about Chucky. After Mancini decided to make Andy Barclay 16 years old, he considered recasting the role with Jonathan Brandis before hiring Justin Whalin. Before Jack Bender became director, Mancini wanted to hire Peter Jackson.

Principal photography began on February 4, 1991, at the Kemper Military School in Boonville, Missouri. Further filming took place in California at Los Angeles and the Universal Studios Lot in Universal City. The carnival scenes were filmed in Valencia, California. The puppeteers made the doll speak using computer technology to control its mouth movements to align with Dourif's prerecorded dialogue. N. Brock Winkless IV returned to work as one of Chucky's puppeteers, as did Van Snowden.

Novelization
A tie-in novel was later written by Matthew J. Costello. Just like Child's Play 2, this novel had some of the author's own parts. In the beginning (unlike the film's), in the Play Pals factory, a rat scours for food and chews on Chucky's remains. Blood then leaks out of the remains and somehow leaks into another doll. Chucky's death in this book is also different. In the novel, Andy shoots Chucky in the chest and causes his body to fall to the floor, and watches his head shatter to blood, metal and plastic.

Release
Child's Play 3 opened in second place behind Dead Again to $5.7 million over the 4-day 1991 Labor Day weekend,  which the Los Angeles Times called "slow numbers". It finished its theatrical run with $15 million in the US, and a total of $20.5 million worldwide.

Reception
On Rotten Tomatoes, the film has an approval rating of 21% based on reviews from 14 critics, and an average rating is 4.50/10, making it the poorest reviewed film in the series on the site. On Metacritic it has a score of 27% based on reviews from 13 critics, indicating "generally unfavorable reviews".

Chris Hicks of the Deseret News called it "perverse" and criticized the film's plot.  Caryn James of The New York Times called the Chucky doll "an impressive technological achievement" but said the film "misses the sharpness and dark humor" of the original film.  Variety called it a "noisy, mindless sequel" with good acting. Richard Harrington of The Washington Post wrote, "Chucky himself is an animatronic delight, but one suspects the film's energies and budget have all been devoted to what is essentially a one-trick pony."  Stephen Wigle of The Baltimore Sun called it "fun for any fan of the slasher genre".

Series creator Don Mancini said that this was his least favorite entry in the series, adding that he ran out of ideas after the second film. He elaborated further in 2013 stating that he was not pleased with the casting, feeling Jeremy Sylvers was too old for the role of Tyler and Dakin Matthews was not the "R. Lee Ermey" archetype he was looking for in Colonel Cochrane.

Mancini would not make another entry in the Chucky series until seven years later, with Bride of Chucky. In a 2017 interview, director Jack Bender also dismissed the film by calling it "kinda silly".

Awards

This film was nominated at the Saturn Award as  Best Horror Film 
and Justin Whalin was nominated as Best Performance by a Younger Actor for his performance in this film.
Andrew Robinson was nominated as Best Supporting Actor at the Fangoria Chainsaw Award.

Home media
Child's Play 3 was originally released on home video in North America on March 12, 1992 and on DVD on October 7, 2003. It was also released in multiple collections, including The Chucky Collection (alongside Child's Play 2 and Bride of Chucky), released on October 7, 2003; Chucky – The Killer DVD Collection (alongside Child's Play 2, Bride and Seed of Chucky), released on September 19, 2006; Chucky: The Complete Collection (alongside Child's Play 1 and 2, Bride, Seed and Curse of Chucky), released on October 8, 2013; and Chucky: Complete 7-Movie Collection (alongside Child's Play 1 and 2, Bride, Seed, Curse and Cult of Chucky), released on October 3, 2017.

Child's Play 3 was released on 4K Ultra HD by Scream! Factory on August 16, 2022. This release included a new 4K scan from the original camera negative, a new Dolby Atmos track and several interviews recorded in 2022 with creator Don Mancini, actress Perry Reeves, executive producer David Kirschner, executive producer Robert Latham Brown, actor Michael Chieffo, makeup artist Craig Reardon and production designer Richard Sawyer.

James Bulger murder
A suggested link with the film was made after the murder of James Bulger. The killers, who were ten years old at the time, were said to have imitated a scene in which one of Chucky's victims is splashed with blue paint. Although these allegations against the film have never been proven, the case led to some new legislation for video films. Psychologist Guy Cumberbatch stated, "The link with a video was that the father of one of the boys – Jon Venables – had rented Child's Play 3 some months earlier." However, the police officer who directed the investigation, Albert Kirby, found that the son, Jon, was not living with his father at the time and was unlikely to have seen the film. Moreover, the boy disliked horror films—a point later confirmed by psychiatric reports. Thus the police investigation, which had specifically looked for a video link, concluded there was none. Despite this, the film remained controversial in Europe, and both Sky Television in the United Kingdom and Canal+ in Spain refused to broadcast the film as regular programming.

Sequels
The film was followed by Bride of Chucky in 1998, Seed of Chucky in 2004, Curse of Chucky in 2013, Cult of Chucky in 2017, and the TV series Chucky in 2021.

Halloween Horror Nights
In 2009, the climax of Child's Play 3 received its own maze at Universal Studios Halloween Horror Nights, entitled Chucky's Fun House.

This is not the first time Chucky has been featured in Halloween Horror Nights. Since 1992, Chucky has starred in his own shows, Chucky's In-Your-Face Insults and Chucky's Insult Emporium. Curse of Chucky also received its own scarezone in the 2013 lineup.

See also

 Dolly Dearest, another 1991 horror movie about a killer doll released two months after Child's Play 3

References

External links

 
 

1991 films
1991 horror films
1990s teen horror films
1990s serial killer films
1990s slasher films
1990s black comedy films
American sequel films
American slasher films
American serial killer films
American teen horror films
American black comedy films
1990s English-language films
Films about the military
Films set in Chicago
Films set in Missouri
Films shot in Missouri
Films shot in Georgia (U.S. state)
Films shot in Los Angeles
Child's Play (franchise) films
Films set in 1998
Universal Pictures films
Films directed by Jack Bender
Films set in amusement parks
1991 directorial debut films
1990s American films
Films about Voodoo